This is a list of earthquakes that have occurred in or have affected Yunnan Province in China.

Major earthquakes (≥Magnitude 7.0)

Major earthquakes (Magnitude 6.0–6.9)

Moderately large earthquakes (≤Magnitude 5.9)

See also 
 List of earthquakes in China
 List of earthquakes in Myanmar
 List of earthquakes in Sichuan
 Geology of China

References 

Earthquakes in Yunnan
Earthquakes in China
Disasters in Yunnan
Disasters in China